Rapiqum was a city of Ancient Mesopotamia during the second millennium BC. The city was located in the north of Babylon, probably on the eastern bank of the Euphrates River, somewhere in the vicinity of today's Ramadi in Iraq; the exact location remains unknown.

History
The city is mentioned in several transaction records of the time, the records of king Sin-Iddinam of Larsa, and of the Mari kingdom.

The city had been independent but was taken by Hammurapi in his 10th or 11th year of rule (around 1782 BC). It thereafter remained in Babylonia. It was also taken at various times by Adad-nirari I, of Assyria and Ibal-pi-el II of Eshnunna.

Location 

The exact location of the city remains unknown but it appears to have been a border town of the Babylonian kingdom, on the Euphrates River, situated between Suhûm and Babylonia, somewhere near the Mari kingdom in Old Babylonia, and north of Babylon.

Its exact location was previously thought to be near Ramadi but recent excavations suggest Tell Anbar, near Fallujah. Excavations in the area of Fallujah have revealed textual evidence of the city of Rapiqum. Currently thinking is that the most likely location is Tell Anbar (Tell Mirmiran), near Falluga.

References

States and territories established in the 3rd millennium BC
States and territories disestablished in the 18th century BC
Populated places established in the 3rd millennium BC
18th century BC
Babylonia
Former populated places in Iraq
2nd-millennium BC establishments
Former monarchies of Asia
History of Western Asia
Ancient Assyrian cities